Ramalayam is a 1971 Indian Telugu-language drama film. The film stars Jaggayya and Shobhan Babu in key roles.

There is a popular song on Lord Rama Jagadabhi Rama Raghukula Soma Saranamu Neeyavaya by Ghantasala.

Plot
The story is about an Indian family of Ramaiah (Jaggaiah) and closely resembles Hindu epic Ramayanam. Ramaiah and Gopi (Shobhan Babu) are brothers. Janaki (Jamuna) is wife of Ramaiah and looks after the home very well. Chitti (Roja Ramani) is their dearly loved sister. They married her into a wealthy family of Kantham (Suryakantham) giving big dowry lending money from Rayudu (Prabhakar Reddy). This leads them to many problems including differences between the family members. Finally their son in law (Chandramohan) and sister helps them solving the problem. The entire family is reunited and live happily.

The Cast

Soundtrack 
There are nine songs in the film.

References

External links
 Watch complete Ramalayam film at Chitranjali.

1970s Telugu-language films
1971 films
Indian black-and-white films